Butterfly McQueen (born Thelma McQueen; January 8, 1911December 22, 1995) was an American actress. Originally a dancer, McQueen first appeared in films as "Prissy" in Gone with the Wind (1939). She was unable to attend the film's premiere because it was held at a whites-only theater. She also appeared in the films, Cabin in the Sky (1943), Mildred Pierce (1944), and Duel in the Sun (1946).

Often typecast as a maid, she said: "I didn't mind playing a maid the first time, because I thought that was how you got into the business. But after I did the same thing over and over, I resented it. I didn't mind being funny, but I didn't like being stupid." She continued as an actress in film in the 1940s, and then moved to television acting in the 1950s. She won a 1980 Daytime Emmy Award for her performance in the ABC Afterschool Special episode "Seven Wishes of a Rich Kid".

Early life and education
Born January 8, 1911 in Tampa, Florida, Thelma McQueen was the daughter of Wallace McQueen, a stevedore/dockworker, and Mary McQueen, who worked as a maid. After her parents separated, Thelma lived with her mother in Augusta, Georgia, where she was educated by nuns at a convent. She had planned to become a nurse until a high-school teacher suggested that she try acting. McQueen initially studied with Janet Collins and danced with the Venezuela Jones Negro Youth Group. Around this time she acquired the nickname "Butterfly" – a tribute to her constantly moving hands – for her performance of the Butterfly Ballet in a production of A Midsummer Night's Dream. Disliking her birth name, she later legally changed it to Butterfly McQueen. She performed with the dance troupe of Katherine Dunham before making her professional debut in George Abbott's Brown Sugar.

Career

McQueen was appearing as a student in the Broadway comedy What a Life in 1938 when she was spotted by Kay Brown, talent scout for David O. Selznick, then in pre-production for Gone With the Wind (eventually released in 1939). Brown recommended that McQueen audition for the film. After Selznick saw her screen test, he never considered anyone else and McQueen was cast in the role that would become her most identifiable – "Prissy", a simple-minded house maid. She uttered the famous words: "Oh, Miss Scarlett! I don't know nothin' 'bout birthin' babies!" Her distinctive, high-pitched voice was described by a critic as "the itsy-little voice fading over the far horizon of comprehension". While the role is well known to audiences, McQueen did not enjoy playing the part and felt it was demeaning to African-Americans.

She had an uncredited bit part as a sales assistant in The Women (1939), filmed after Gone with the Wind but released before it. She also played Butterfly, Rochester's niece and Mary Livingstone's maid, in Jack Benny's radio program in the 1940s. She appeared in an uncredited role in Mildred Pierce (1945) and played a supporting role in Duel in the Sun (1946). By 1947, she had grown tired of the ethnic stereotypes she was required to play and ended her film career. During World War II, McQueen frequently appeared as a comedian on the Armed Forces Radio Service broadcast Jubilee. Many of these broadcasts are available on the Internet Archive.

From 1950 until 1952, she was featured (and briefly reunited with fellow Gone With the Wind actor Hattie McDaniel, who appeared in the first six episodes before withdrawing due to illness) in another racially stereotyped role on the television series Beulah, in which she played Beulah's friend Oriole, a character originated on radio by Ruby Dandridge, who took over the TV role from McQueen in 1952–53. In 1964 she starred alongside Marion Marlowe in the Off-Broadway commercial flop, The Athenian Touch. In a lighter moment, she appeared in a 1969 episode of The Dating Game.

McQueen was in the original version of the stage musical The Wiz when it debuted in Baltimore, Maryland in 1974. She played the Queen of the Field Mice, a character from the original L. Frank Baum novel The Wonderful Wizard of Oz. However, when the show was revised prior to going to Broadway, McQueen's role was cut by incoming director Geoffrey Holder.

Offers for acting roles began to dry up around this time, and she devoted herself to other pursuits including political study. She received a bachelor's degree in political science from City College of New York in 1975. McQueen played the character of Aunt Thelma, a fairy godmother, in the ABC Weekend Special episode "The Seven Wishes of Joanna Peabody" (1978) and the ABC Afterschool Special episode "Seven Wishes of a Rich Kid" (1979); her performance in the latter earned her a Daytime Emmy Award for Outstanding Individual Achievement in Children's Programming. Her final feature film role was in The Mosquito Coast (1986). Her final appearance was in the TV movie Polly, a reimagining of the Pollyanna story with a Black cast.

Personal life
McQueen never married nor had any children. She lived in New York in the summer months and in Augusta, Georgia, during the winter.

A Democrat, she supported Adlai Stevenson's campaign during the 1952 presidential election.

In 1975, aged 64, McQueen received a bachelor's degree in political science from City College of New York.

In July 1983, a jury awarded McQueen $60,000 in a judgment stemming from a lawsuit she filed against two bus terminal security guards. McQueen sued for harassment after she claimed the security guards accused her of being a pickpocket and a vagrant while she was at a Washington, D.C. Greyhound bus terminal in April 1979.

Atheism 
In 1989, the Freedom From Religion Foundation honored her with its Freethought Heroine Award. "I'm an atheist," she had declared, "and Christianity appears to me to be the most absurd imposture of all the religions, and I'm puzzled that so many people can't see through a religion that encourages irresponsibility and bigotry." 

She told a reporter, "As my ancestors are free from slavery, I am free from the slavery of religion." This quote was used by the Freedom From Religion Foundation in advertisements inside Madison, Wisconsin, buses in 2009 and in an Atlanta market in 2010. 

She lamented that, if humans had focused on Earth and on people, rather than on mythology and on Jesus, there would be less hunger and homelessness. "They say the streets are going to be beautiful in Heaven. Well, I'm trying to make the streets beautiful here ... When it's clean and beautiful, I think America is heaven. And some people are hell."

Death
McQueen died at age 84 on December 22, 1995, at Doctors Hospital in Augusta, from burns sustained when a kerosene heater she attempted to light malfunctioned and burst into flames. McQueen donated her body to medical science and remembered the Freedom From Religion Foundation in her will.

Filmography

Further reading

References

External links

 
 
 
 
 Hear Butterfly McQueen perform on a broadcast of Dinah Shore's radio show

1911 births
1995 deaths
Actresses from Tampa, Florida
Actresses from Augusta, Georgia
Dancers from Florida
American radio actresses
American female dancers
American film actresses
American stage actresses
American television actresses
African-American female dancers
African-American atheists
American atheists
American humanists
Florida Democrats
Georgia (U.S. state) Democrats
Accidental deaths in Georgia (U.S. state)
Deaths from fire in the United States
Daytime Emmy Award winners
City College of New York alumni
20th-century American actresses
20th-century American dancers
20th-century African-American women
Critics of Christianity